Yury Viktorovich Berezhko (born 27 January 1984) is a Russian volleyball player. He currently plays outside hitter for VC Zenit-Kazan.

He is an Olympic gold medalist (2012), bronze medalist (2008), World Cup silver medalist and a silver medalist at the 2007 European Championship in Moscow, Russia, playing with the men's national team. Berezhko won Best server Award in 2009 European Championship. He won the award of Best Spiker in that occasion. In January, 2016 Yury Berezhko resumed performances for the Russian national team, helping the Russians qualify for the Olympic Games in Rio de Janeiro.

Sporting achievements

CEV Cup
  2014/2015, with Dinamo Moscow

Individual awards
2007 European Volleyball Championship – "Best Spiker"
2007 World League – "Best Spiker"
2009 European Volleyball Championship – "Best Server"
2003 European Champions League – "Best Receiver"

References
FIVB Profile

1984 births
Living people
People from Komsomolsk-on-Amur
Russian men's volleyball players
Volleyball players at the 2008 Summer Olympics
Volleyball players at the 2012 Summer Olympics
Olympic volleyball players of Russia
Olympic gold medalists for Russia
Olympic bronze medalists for Russia
Olympic medalists in volleyball
Medalists at the 2012 Summer Olympics
Medalists at the 2008 Summer Olympics
Galatasaray S.K. (men's volleyball) players
VC Zenit Kazan players
Sportspeople from Khabarovsk Krai